Description is the pattern of narrative development that aims to make vivid a place, object, character, or group. Description is one of four rhetorical modes (also known as modes of discourse), along with exposition, argumentation, and narration.  In practice it would be difficult to write literature that drew on just one of the four basic modes.

As a fiction-writing mode
Fiction-writing also has modes: action, exposition, description, dialogue, summary, and transition. Author Peter Selgin refers to methods, including action, dialogue, thoughts, summary, scenes, and description. Currently, there is no consensus within the writing community regarding the number and composition of fiction-writing modes and their uses.

Description is the fiction-writing mode for transmitting a mental image of the particulars of a story. Together with dialogue, narration, exposition, and summarization, description is one of the most widely recognized of the fiction-writing modes. As stated in Writing from A to Z, edited by Kirk Polking, description is more than the amassing of details; it is bringing something to life by carefully choosing and arranging words and phrases to produce the desired effect. The most appropriate and effective techniques for presenting description are a matter of ongoing discussion among writers and writing coaches.

Purple prose

A purple patch is an over-written passage in which the writer has strained too hard to achieve an impressive effect, by elaborate figures or other means.  The phrase (Latin:  "purpureus pannus") was first used by the Roman poet Horace in his Ars Poetica (c. 20 BC) to denote an irrelevant and excessively ornate passage; the sense of irrelevance is normally absent in modern usage, although such passages are usually incongruous.  By extension, purple prose is lavishly figurative, rhythmic, or otherwise overwrought.

Philosophy
In philosophy, the nature of description has been an important question since Bertrand Russell's classical texts.

See also

 Anthropomorphism
 Cliché
 Diction
 Grammatical modifier
 Grammatical voice
 Metaphors
 Nouns
 Objectification
 Personification
 Referential density
 Relevance
 Rhetorical devices
 Simile
 Species description
 Verisimilitude

Notes

References
 
 
 
 
 
 Rozakis, Laurie (2003). The Complete Idiot's Guide to Grammar and Style, 2nd Edition. Alpha. 
 

Grammar
Narratology
Writing
Rhetoric
Literary concepts
Rhetorical techniques
Philosophical logic
Fiction-writing mode